Ijoko is a town in Sango /Ijoko Local Council Development Area of Ogun State, Western Nigeria, located north of Lagos and south of Abeokuta.

Geography
It is an Ogun State border town with Lagos with large scale businesses and thriving retail businesses, a spill over from the congested mega city of Lagos. Ijoko is originally an Owu-Egba settlement but also accommodating other diverse people.

History
The history of Ijoko otherwise known as Igbo Olowu is linked with that of Sango as they were both the war captives of the allied forces of Owu and Egba on behalf of Abeokuta that conquered Dahomey, Ado-Odo, Atan, Ilobi, Itori, Ota, Ifo, between 1836 and 1853. The territory is customarily administered to date by the Egbas through officials or coronets of either the Alake or the Olowu. The Olota who himself is a coronet of Alake of Abeokuta together with his Chiefs vehemently condemned in 1935 the agitation of the Awori youths on the ownership of Ota District and declared that the Owu – Egbas under the leadership of Alake on behalf of Abeokuta are the owners of Ota by conquest with the Colonial District Officer directed by his boss the Resident Officer for Abeokuta as British Crown Witness. Between 1853 and 1900, Ota was ruled by Egbas through their resident representatives. 1900ff Ota was ruled directly by Alake through his Local Council. The Egba and Owu warriors installed the first Olota – Oyede 1. The Egba resident representatives installed Olota – Isiyemi in 1882. Alake installed Olota – Aina Ako in 1902. Alake installed Olota – Oyede 2nd in 1927 etc. They all paid conditional and compulsory tributes and allegiance to the Alake as his subjects by virtue of Abeokuta’s conquest over Ota opt cite. They were allowed to farm for livelihoods as his subjects and as his tenants under Abeokuta’s Lordship and conquest over the entire Ota District Land. It is therefore an aberration for any family in Ota or Ijoko to be describing themselves as the owner or an Ajagungbale trying to reclaim a land that have been lost by their progenitors in battle and ruled by the Alake through his officials and coronets up to date.
The claim of founding a land that belongs to the Egbas jointly with the Owus since the conquest of the whole of Ota Land in 1839 to 1842 is an affront to the Egbas and an insult to the Alake and the Olowu of Abeokuta. Nobody can lay claim to the ownership of Ota District Land and Chieftaincy titles particularly as an Oba without the consent of the whole of Abeokuta through the Alake after consultations with the other Abeokuta Obas. It is on this note that Ijoko and environ is an Abeokuta Land. No individual family owns Ijoko. A family can only lay claim to a few acres assigned to it for peasant farming in the virgin land, nothing more. It is an Egba Land by conquest under Alake’s trust for Abeokuta. Ajagungbale is a precolonial foreclosure in favour of Abeokuta on the entire Ota District Land which include Ijoko and environ.
Past litigations on the ownership of Ijoko Egbaland have misled the courts and the State Land Office without the input of the Egba-Owu Traditional Councils on behalf of all Owu and Egba nation. These were simply cases between two Ota families that were completely silent or wilfully ignored the above cited facts of history of Abeokuta’s ownership of the Ota District Land. Neither the Alake nor the Olowu were joined in such suits. Whoever sold and is still selling Ijoko Egbaland without the consent of Alake or the Olowu based on Ijoko ownership is making and profiting from acts of illegality. Hence, the genesis of the terrible land and chieftaincy title conflicts going on between a single family versus many Egba and Owu families most of whom are the descendants of the Great Egba and Owu Warriors that conquered the entire Ota District of Abeokuta.
That one of the settlers was made the hamlet leader or imposed himself as one does not make him the founder and owner of Ijoko. In fact, nobody regarded himself as such as the Lordship of the Alake and ownership of the virgin forest was never in contention. It is the modern covetiousness for money and power that made some greedy youths to falsify history. Judicial pronouncements that do not recognise the authentic record of history cannot bring peace in the land. It will only be a theoretical  legal academic exercise.
The Alake and the Olowu must unite because it was unity that gave Abeokuta the victory, the conquest and the ownership of Ota District. They must consult with their kiths and kins who have been on the ground for centuries.
Ijoko's proximity with Lagos have always made it prosperous and civilised.

The Origin of Modern Land Speculation in Ijoko

Transport 
It is served by a station on the western network of the national railways since 1912 by virtue of a treaty signed with the United Kingdom by the Alake solely for this purpose as the officially recognised owner of the whole of Ota District Land for Abeokuta. Ijoko is also served by various road networks that leads to neighborhood city of Lagos, Idiroko, Ifo.

See also 
 Railway stations in Nigeria

References 

Populated places in Ogun State
Towns in Yorubaland